Somporn On-Chim (born 31 March 1942) is a Thai sports shooter. He competed in the men's 50 metre rifle three positions event at the 1976 Summer Olympics.

References

1942 births
Living people
Somporn On-Chim
Somporn On-Chim
Shooters at the 1976 Summer Olympics
Place of birth missing (living people)
Asian Games medalists in shooting
Shooters at the 1974 Asian Games
Somporn On-Chim
Medalists at the 1974 Asian Games
Somporn On-Chim